Angus Fogg (born 26 August 1967) is a championship-winning New Zealand racing driver.

New Zealand V8 Championship
Angus Fogg joined the NZ V8 Championship for the 2003-04 season after taking a year off from motorsport. His debut season in NZV8's was as a privateer, but his previous involvements with the V8 Supercars helped his cause, coming home 4th place overall, and taking the Rookie of the Year title as well. Fogg joined the International Motorsport team for the following season where he built two Ford Falcon V8s for the 2004-05 season but could not manage the same performance as the season before, finishing up 12th overall. 2005-06 was another good season for Fogg, finishing up 2nd overall and he was also the first Ford driver home, in 2007-07 he was third overall, and in 2007-08 second overall. Fogg finished sixth overall in the 2008-09 Championship, 8th in the 2009-10 Championship, and 4th in the 2010-12 Championship after leading the points table virtually all season. Fogg currently holds the lap record for the New Zealand V8s Championship series at Manfeild Autocourse of 1:12.810 (2008)). 

As of Round Two of the 2011-12 BNTV8s Championship at Powerbuilt Raceway at Ruapuna Park at 10–11 December 2011 Fogg lead the points tables with 418 points over Jason Bargwanna with 362 points and Tim Edgell on 324 points.

Fogg runs his own 'Radio Sport' race team in conjunction with car owner Kevin Williams.

Fogg's family of sponsors in his 2011-12 quest to win New Zealand’s Gold Star Saloon title include Radio Sport, Mountshop, Hydraulink Hose & Fittings, Supercharge Batteries, Segedins Auto Spares of Dominion Road, Strapping Systems (NZ) Ltd, Moselle Panel & Paint, PPG, Affordable PartsWorld, HIAB Services, Delo, Brenics Transport Ltd, i-Sign it, Fromm Packaging Systems, Tom Ryan Cartage, The Interislander, Mason Tool & Engineering, Stainless Welding and Invercargill Oil Shop.

Career results

Bathurst 1000 results

References

2011-12 NZ V8 Touring Cars Championship Points Table

Angus Fogg's Official Website

Eric Thompson's article in the NZ Herald Following NZV8s Championship Round Two, December 2011

External links
Official Website

1967 births
Living people
New Zealand racing drivers
Sportspeople from Cambridge, New Zealand
Supercars Championship drivers
V8SuperTourer drivers